WAGT-CD (channel 26) is a low-power, Class A television station in Augusta, Georgia, United States, affiliated with NBC and The CW Plus. It is owned by Gray Television alongside dual CBS/MyNetworkTV affiliate WRDW-TV (channel 12). Both stations share studios at The Village at Riverwatch development in Augusta, while WAGT-CD's transmitter is located in Beech Island, South Carolina.

Due to WAGT-CD's low-power status, it can only be seen in the immediate Augusta area. Therefore, the station's main NBC channel is simulcast in 1080i full high definition on WRDW-TV's second digital subchannel to reach the entire market.

History
The license for W67BE (the call letters reflected its original location on UHF channel 67) was first granted on March 28, 1985. It was Augusta's first independent station, airing a collection of public domain black-and-white western movies, infomercials and programming such as Sewing with Nancy (unusual as that program was mainly offered for public television). It later became Augusta's first Fox affiliate before the emergence of WFXG (channel 54) in 1991. The station would eventually re-make itself, and on January 2, 1995, the station became WBEK-LP, an affiliate of The WB. During this period, the station was known locally as "The WB on WBEK 67".

In 1998, WBAU, a local affiliate of The WB 100+ Station Group, signed on, appearing on cable systems in the Augusta area; as a result, WBEK lost its WB affiliation. The station then became an affiliate of UPN, and for a few years sold advertising on WBAU, before these rights went to WRDW-TV (channel 12; this changed hands once more before The WB 100+ was replaced with The CW Plus). In 2001, WBEK moved to its present channel location, channel 16, and obtained Class A status (modifying its call sign to WBEK-CA).

After the affiliation switch, the station attempted to maintain its status as a "top" local affiliate. The station's move to channel 16 had come with a loss in power, and viewership began to decline. The station picked up a secondary affiliation with America One during this period. In 2004, the station lost the UPN affiliation to WRDW's digital subchannel 31.2 ("UPN Augusta"), and continued on with America One programming to very little viewer interest. In 2015, the station converted to digital broadcasting and became WBEK-CD. That same year, America One and cable network Youtoo TV merged to become Youtoo America.

On August 27, 2015, longtime owner AVN agreed to sell WBEK-CD to Gray Television, owner of WRDW-TV, for $550,000. The sale did not include the station's existing cable carriage on Comcast or the WBEK call letters; Gray thus applied to change the station's call letters to WRDW-CD. The sale was completed on October 27, 2015, at which time the call sign change to WRDW-CD took effect.

In September 2015, Gray announced its purchase of the television properties of Schurz Communications, including Augusta NBC affiliate WAGT. Gray proposed to merge the two stations' operations at WRDW's facilities (replacing a previous shared services agreement with Media General), and offer its wireless spectrum during the FCC's upcoming spectrum reallocation auction. Gray could not legally own both WRDW and WAGT; FCC rules do not allow one entity to own two of the four highest-rated stations in a market, and Augusta had only five full-power stations—not enough to legally permit a duopoly in any event. To solve the problem, Gray had proposed a waiver in which it would shut down WAGT upon closure of the deal. In January 2016, Gray requested special temporary authority for WRDW-CD to immediately move to the same operating facilities and UHF channel 30 as WAGT. As it would cause interference, Gray stated that WAGT would simultaneously discontinue its full-power signal, practically replacing it with WRDW-CD. This request implied that Gray intended to transfer the WAGT intellectual unit (programming, NBC affiliation and staff) to the low-power signal upon the completion of its purchase, as they are not subject to FCC duopoly rules. On February 1, 2016, the station's call letters changed to WAGT-CD.

The FCC approved the sale of Schurz's television properties to Gray on February 12, 2016, and approved Gray's waiver for the duopoly restrictions concerning WRDW and WAGT. However, it ruled that Gray had to continue operating WAGT through the auction. Gray went on with its plans to end the SSA and JSA with Media General; the company was granted an injunction restricting removal of the JSA or sale of the station after accusing Gray of violating the agreement, but it was struck down by the Supreme Court on March 23, 2016. In the auction, WAGT's broadcast spectrum was sold for $40,763,036. The FCC stated that WAGT planned to go off-air, and not share spectrum with another channel. This happened on May 31, 2017, when Gray Television returned the license of WAGT to the FCC; upon doing so, WAGT-CD assumed the channel 26 virtual channel and WAGT's subchannels, and Youtoo America-sourced programming was entirely discontinued.

Subchannels
The station's digital signal is multiplexed:

See also

Media in Augusta, Georgia

References

External links

WAGT-DT2 "CW Augusta"

AGT-CD
NBC network affiliates
The CW affiliates
Antenna TV affiliates
Dabl affiliates
Heroes & Icons affiliates
Start TV affiliates
Television channels and stations established in 1987
1987 establishments in Georgia (U.S. state)
Gray Television
Low-power television stations in the United States